Belgium is an unincorporated community in Taylor County, West Virginia, United States.

References 

Belgian-American culture in West Virginia
Northwestern Turnpike
Unincorporated communities in Taylor County, West Virginia
Unincorporated communities in West Virginia
Clarksburg micropolitan area